Kim Yi-Yong (born 20 September 1973, in Gangwon-do) is a retired South Korean long-distance runner who specialized in the marathon. He was the 2004 Asian Marathon Championship winner.

His personal best for the marathon is 2:07:49 hours, set in 1999.

International competitions

References
 

1973 births
Living people
South Korean male long-distance runners
South Korean male marathon runners
Athletes (track and field) at the 1996 Summer Olympics
Athletes (track and field) at the 2008 Summer Olympics
Olympic athletes of South Korea
Athletes (track and field) at the 1998 Asian Games
Athletes (track and field) at the 2006 Asian Games
Asian Games competitors for South Korea
20th-century South Korean people